Siyasanga Catherine Papu (born 14 July 1986), is a South African actress, entrepreneur, singer and sketch artist. She is best known for the roles in the television serials such as; Hillside, The Herd and Gomora. And also Izintombi Zodwa in 2013

Personal life
Siyasanga Papu was born on 14 July 1986 in Pretoria, Gauteng, South Africa. She completed high school at Hoerskool Elandspoort, located in Danville, west of Pretoria from 2000 to 2004. Then in 2005, she enrolled in filmmaking at Damelin.

She is a mother of one daughter.

Career
Before television, she made extensive appearances in the theatre stage where she toured internationally and locally since 2005. In 2007, she performed in the play Speak Out took place at Sheraton hotel. In 2008, she performed in the theatre play Ag Man Nee Man done on World's Aids Day. Then she joined with the theatre musical play, Jock of the Bushveld in 2010 and played the role of a "mothering hippo".

In 2006, she joined with the SABC2 drama Hillside and played the role "Nurse Dineo". She reprised the role in the second season as well. Then in 2016, she joined with the second season of Mzansi Magic drama Saints and Sinners to play the role "Lena Zondi". In 2015, role as Nomathemba on the supernatural drama series The Herd. In 2018, she made the recurring role of "Fezeka" on the sixth season of the Mzansi Magic soap opera Isibaya. In the same year, she made the lead role as "Nomathemba" on the Mzansi Magic supernatural drama The Herd.

Then in 2019, she appeared in the Mzansi Magic telenovela with a minor role as "social worker". Later in 2020, she joined with lead cast of another Mzansi Magic telenovela Gomora to play the role "Pretty" for two seasons. Apart from them, she made sporadic appearances in the soapi opera Generations: The Legacy and Rhythm City. As a vocalist, she has a 6-piece band and has two Naledi nominations for roles played in musical theatre shows.

Filmography

References

External links
 IMDb

1986 births
Living people
South African film actresses
South African television actresses
South African stage actresses